Jonathan Blanes Núñez (born March 10, 1987 in Paysandú) is a Uruguayan professional footballer who plays as an attacking midfielder for River Plate in the Uruguayan Primera División.

Honours

Club
Racing Club
 2007-2008 Uruguayan Segunda División championship

References

External links
 
 

1987 births
Living people
Footballers from Paysandú
Uruguayan footballers
Uruguayan people of Catalan descent
Uruguayan expatriate footballers
Association football midfielders
Racing Club de Montevideo players
Atlético Tucumán footballers
Liverpool F.C. (Montevideo) players
Juventud de Las Piedras players
Club Atlético River Plate (Montevideo) players
Expatriate footballers in Argentina